WFYC (1280 AM) is a radio station licensed to Alma, Michigan, United States, broadcasting a mainstream country music format. Prior to mid-2016, the station carried a sports radio format from ESPN Radio and the Michigan IMG Sports Network. However, according to http://www.wqbx.biz/wfyc-1280-am.html, WFYC is now Fox Sports.

Sources 
Michiguide.com - WFYC History

External links
Fox Sports 1280 Facebook
WQBX Online

FYC
Country radio stations in the United States